Begin or Bégin may refer to:

People
Begin (surname)

Music
 Begin (band), a Japanese pop trio
 Begin (David Archuleta album), 2012
 begin (Riyu Kosaka album), 2004
 Begin (Lion Babe album)
 Begin (The Millennium album)
 Begin by Parkway Drive from Horizons, 2007
 beGin, an album by Gin Lee
 Begin, an album by Cyndi Wang
 "Begin", a song by the band BTS included in the album Wings

Other
 Bégin, Quebec, a municipality in Canada
 Begin (video game), a 1984 video game
 Highway 50 (Israel/Palestine) or Begin Expressway, a freeway in Jerusalem
 Begin Road, a street in Tel Aviv, Israel
 Begin block, a grouping of statements in programming languages

See also
 Beginning (disambiguation)
 Beginnings (disambiguation)
 Origin (disambiguation)
 Source (disambiguation)
 Start (disambiguation)